The conservation-restoration of panel paintings involves preventive and treatment measures taken by paintings conservators to slow deterioration, preserve, and repair damage. Panel paintings consist of a wood support, a ground (linen or parchment sized with glues, resin, and gesso), and an image layer (encaustic, tempera, oil). They are typically constructed of two or more panels joined together by crossbeam braces which can separate due to age and material instability caused by fluctuations in relative humidity and temperature. These factors compromise structural integrity and can lead to warping and paint flaking. Because wood is particularly susceptible to pest damage, an IPM plan and regulation of the conditions in storage and display are essential. Past treatments that have fallen out of favor because they can cause permanent damage include transfer of the painting onto a new support, planing, and heavy cradling. Today's conservators often have to remediate damage from previous restoration efforts. Modern conservation-restoration techniques favor minimal intervention that accommodates wood's natural tendency to react to environmental changes. Treatments may include applying flexible battens to minimize deformation or simply leaving distortions alone, instead focusing on preventive care to preserve the artwork in its original state.

Preventive care 
Preventive conservation involves the mitigation of potential threats to the stability of an artifact or specimen through a number of means. Threats such as fire, flood, natural disaster, physical force, and theft cannot be foreseen and inherent vice can only be addressed through prudent risk management, care, and handling of museum objects.

Conservation and curatorial staff can mitigate risks by correcting improper storage conditions which may lead to damage from pests, water, humidity, and mold. These issues can be further catalyzed by regional and seasonal environmental fluctuations and pollution. Proper handling protocols can help prevent chemical damage caused by contact with skin oils and structural damage from physical stress. Deterioration also occurs as a result of light exposure when objects are examined, exhibited, photographed, and transported.

Environmental conditions 
Fluctuating humidity and temperatures can lead to structural damage of a painted surface due to long-term cumulative damage. In panels that are made up of multiple pieces of wood composing the larger surface area, the damage is most often visible where the pieces of wood are attached. Temperatures should range between +/- 5% of 70 °F and the humidity between +/- 5% of 50% Relative Humidity. A Relative Humidity over 65% can lead to mold growth and dry rot.

Panel paintings are subjected to various environmental conditions during exhibition. Regulating temperature, relative humidity, light intensity and duration of exposure, and atmospheric pollutants are essential factors in painting conservation. Air filtration via HVAC systems can reduce gases and airborne pollutants within exhibition spaces and storage areas. Maintaining light levels as low as possible, between 50-150 Lux, will minimize cumulative and irreversible light damage.

Integrated pest management 

Integrated Pest Management policies are created to reduce or limit any problems relating to pests damaging objects within collections. Basic concepts discussed in Integrated Pest Management Policies include restricting food and sugary drink consumption in exhibition, storage areas and surrounding areas along with maintaining cleanliness in exhibition and storage areas. As noted, storage also comes into play when it comes to pest management, climate control, assessment of HVAC systems, and contamination due to exposure.

Handling 
Prior to any handling, an examination of the work should be completed, including looking for signs of weakened structure and material stability. Both the painting and the space to which it is being transferred should be measured. These notes should be shared with preparators, registrars, and curatorial staff. The recommended handling method for panel paintings is similar to that of canvas and other two-dimensional works. Conservators are the only persons that should touch the front or back of a painting. The panel should be held by the edges using nitrile gloves and carried with two hands or in tandem by two people, depending on size. Paintings should never be handled more than one at a time. The procedure includes planning the move, handling, and communication with staff. Painting carts and other tools may be used, including a pallet jack or furniture dolly for moving a panel within a crate. The Metropolitan Museum of Art, the Canadian Conservation Institute, and the Australian Institute for the Conservation of Cultural Material provide general guidelines on proper care and handling.

Storage 
Typical storage units in museums include sliding screens or slotted shelves made out of MDF and heat-treated wood coated in polyurethane.  "S" hooks are used to hang objects with the proper hanging hardware (e.g. D-Rings or eye brackets with picture wire) onto a screen. Temporary storage solutions include the use of ethafoam, moving/packing blankets, and archival corrugated cardboard. These storage methods are employed in order to minimize exposure to heat, light, and humidity, and pests. All exposure is cumulative so it is important to plan carefully the challenges of exhibition conditions, as well as transportation and storage of objects when they are not being displayed. As objects become more fragile over time, the ability to display them can be challenged by deterioration concerns.

Agents of deterioration 

Damage may occur for a variety of reasons, generally known as agents of deterioration. Typical agents of deterioration include:

Physical force
Mishandling, overhandling, being dropped or stored improperly can all cause physical damage to panel paintings.

Fire
Fire may destroy a painting entirely, or damage may also be caused due to the heat and smoke of a fire. Paint may become brittle or wood may warp.

Temperature and relative humidity
Paintings may be affected by fluctuating temperature and Relative Humidity. Low Humidity reduces the chemical changes to the materials in a panel painting but raises the risks of mechanical damage to the paint by making it more brittle. High temperatures and humidity in enclosed storage or exhibition space may lead to excess moisture that warps the painting. High Humidity reduces mechanical damage such as brittle paint but raises the risks of biological organisms, e.g. white efflorescence and green-to-black stains on a panel painting. High Humidity also raises the risks of curving or warping of the wood over time, forcing the paint to flake off.

Water
Water damage may cause swelling, as seen in a case study by the Getty Conservation Institute, and water-soluble paints and other materials may dissolve. A wooden panel may also be distorted, split, shrunken, or stained when subjected to water. Mold may also occur as the materials are organic.

Pests
In this case, pests are defined as living creatures able to damage or destroy material culture. Microorganisms such as mold or bacteria are considered pests, as are insects and rodents. Any of the three may cause damage to a panel painting, in particular wood pests such as termites or carpenter ants.

Light and ultraviolet radiation
Overexposure to light and ultraviolet radiation may cause fading over time. A material's colorant sensitivity, or the estimate of how much light exposure it should be able to tolerate before fading, determines how an object may be stored and exhibited. When handling panel paintings they should never be exposed to heat including photographic lamps. It is recommended that HMI lamps are used for photographing panel paintings.

Examination 
The first step in developing a conservation-restoration plan is close examination to estimate the condition of both the panel and paint. This allows conservators to ascertain the full extent of damage and make a risk assessment. Techniques include visual observation and technically-assisted examination through diagnostic studies and analysis.

Structural 

Technologies commonly used to examine the structure of paintings and identify previous treatments include radiography and infrared reflectography (IR). Radiography reveals the type, condition and density of the wood, as well as any pest damage or activity. Furniture and Larder Beetles 
 can burrow into wood compromising its internal structure and should be treated before proceeding with the restoration.  IR, raking light photography, and low-magnification observation are useful in determining damage and distortion to the wood and paint surface.

Surface and painting 

Photographic documentation, magnification, and visual observation with the naked eye under diffuse or raking light are common methods of surface examination. Radiography can also be used to revel the opacity of specific paint colors. Degradation to the surface of panel paintings is often a sign of underlying structural issues, temperature and humidity fluctuations, and wood-boring pests.

Examples of technology

 Reflectance transformation imaging is a type of photography that uses digital computation instead of optical processes to create new data as seen with the Penn Museum's Fayum Mummy Portraits.
 X-ray fluorescence is a non-destructive analytical technique used to determine the elemental composition of materials. 
 Multispectral imaging enables the extraction of information that the human eye fails to capture with its visible receptors for red, green and blue. It was originally developed for military target identification and reconnaissance.
 X-Ray radiography an imaging technique using X-rays, gamma rays, or similar ionizing radiation and non-ionizing radiation to view the internal form of an object. 
 Ultraviolet light is used to observe wavelengths shorter than visible light. 
 Infra-red reflectography is used to observe wavelengths longer than visible light.
These technologies have been employed in the conservation of Millais's painting, Ophelia, at the Tate museum. Although this example is not directly related to panel paintings, it is a valuable demonstration of the technology.

Treatments
Treatments applied to paintings in order to mitigate damage caused by various agents of deterioration are varied. Treatment consists of any efforts made to stabilize, restore, or repair an object; panel paintings, being heavily wood-based, may need treatment for pests, weakened structural supports, failed adhesives, temperature and relative humidity damage, general dirt and grime, and more. Documentation of all treatments applied to a panel painting is crucial, as it determines the course of future conservation-restoration efforts. The following treatments are often seen in conservation of panel paintings:

Pest management

Exposure to pests may cause structural damage to wood panels and supports and should be eradicated prior to conservation to ensure the longevity of the object and the effectiveness of conservation efforts. Pest management methods include:
 Isolation Through Bagging - isolate paintings with blotter paper, paper board, tissue, or foam sealed in a polyethylene bag and monitor for pests over several weeks or months.
 Low Temperature - freeze paintings placed inside a sealed plastic bag at a temperature of -20 °F (-29 °C) for 4 hours. 
Overexposure to fluctuations in Relative Humidity and temperature should be monitored when managing pests to prevent damage to the painting.

Creating supports 
Each panel undergoing conservation has unique considerations when creating support structures. Conservators must draw upon their experience in formulating treatment plans in order to develop the best treatment plan for each individual panel painting. Two supportive structures commonly used in conservation include: 
 Custom strainers or inner panelings that are fit to the painting and secured with screws, therefore offering strength to the painting and allowing hanging devices to be attached without damaging a painting.
 Cradling - Cradling refers to the addition of wooden supports or frames on the back of paintings. These slats require flexibility to allow for panel movement caused by fluctuations in temperature and humidity. They may prevent warping as they provide support for the painting.

Applying adhesives 
Cracks, loosened joints, and other such damage to a panel painting, which may be caused by various agents of deterioration, can be treated by applying the proper adhesive. Adhesive treatments include:
 Reactivation of hide glues. Hide glues, often made from processed cow hides, are a protein-based adhesive commonly used by conservators as the glue is known for both its longevity and reversibility. Hide glues may be reactivated with heat, allowing for repairs to be made where glued joints have begun to loosen.
 Adding water-based emulsion glues to existing and failing adhesives. The conservator may choose to add additional adhesives to existing adhesives, depending on the state of the existing adhesive.
 Replacing failed adhesives with new ones. The conservator may choose to replace a failed adhesive entirely. In this case, the conservator must carefully remove the failed adhesive from the area they plan to re-glue. Methods by which to do so are dependent on the type of adhesive first used as well as past treatments. After the original adhesive has been removed, the conservator may carry on with applying a new adhesive. 
Types of adhesives:
 Natural protein adhesives - made of animal products such as casein, albumin, fish glue, and animal-hide glue, these protein adhesives are also referred to as bioadhesives as they are made from naturally occurring materials and are biodegradable.
 Natural resins - often used in historic objects, natural resins (turpentine, rosin, dragon's blood, etc.) are mainly located from trees, in particular coniferous trees such as pines. Other sources include shellac, which is insect-based. Natural resins are not water-soluble and should be mixed with either oil or spirits, dependent on resin type, before use.
 Synthetic resin adhesives - commonly used synthetic resin adhesives include polyvinyl acetate (PVA), polyvinyl acetate emulsions, Paraloid B-72, cellulose nitrate, also called nitrocelluloid, polyvinyl butyral, polymethacrylate emulsions, polyvinyl alcohol, and Elmer's Glue All, although the latter is debated amongst conservators.  The synthetic resin most commonly used in conservation, polyvinyl acetate (PVA), is used as a glue and a consolidant based upon its viscosity. The higher viscosity glues are considered to have better bonding abilities, while low viscosity PVAs are best as consolidants given their ability to penetrate an object. PVA beads should be dissolved into a solvent (acetone is commonly used) before use. Conservators should be cautious of applying these adhesives to thin or textile-based panels, as there may be some distortion as the adhesive dries.

Transferring panel paintings 
Transfer of panel paintings from an unstable panel to a new support is considered to be a delicate process. This process occurs when there has been a form of degradation in the original panel (possible causes include pest damage, burrowing, warping, or panel thinning). The transfer should be made to a similarly aged panel, made of the same wood type. These transfers have become almost obsolete given advances in the conservation field, but were common in Italy into the 1950s.  Early efforts to transfer panel paintings were unrefined and lead to distortions in the paintings, but in later years the technique became more refined.

Drying 
The recommended procedure for panels submerged due to flooding is to exposure to a long drying process prior to any further conservation work. This process should not be rushed in order to prevent further damage to the panels.

Conserving painted surfaces 

The conservation of the surface of a painting varies depending on the materials used in a painting as well as its condition. Generally, conservation of a painted surface includes cleaning, removal, and replacement of degraded varnish and the restoration of paint losses. According to the Tate Museum, "cleaning is a particularly delicate and demanding part of conserving and restoring paintings. Layers of dirt, discolored varnish, and old restorations that may be disfiguring or obscuring parts of the composition are painstakingly removed."

The evolution of modern materials that can be used in panel paintings and their conservation has positively impacted conservation techniques. "The introduction of synthetic binders—most notably acrylic, alkyd, polyvinyl acetate, and nitrocellulose—has resulted in paints that exhibit fast drying times, reduced yellowing tendencies, a vast range of appearances and handling properties and, in the case of emulsion formulations, great flexibility and the elimination of organic solvents as thinners and diluents," according to the Getty Conservation Institute.

Conservation ethics resources 

The care and management of cultural heritage materials should be addressed with consideration for the physical and symbolic integrity of the artifact. While the virtues of object integrity may be contested in professional circles, the ultimate goal is preservation. Institutions are governed by their mission statement, and international, federal, and local laws surrounding cultural heritage objects. It is critical that thorough research is conducted not only on the materials but also on the ethical and moral implications of handling figuratively and literally valuable artifacts. The following links address conservation ethics, including the restoration of panel paintings.

Examples of codes of ethics 

 American Institute for Conservation (AIC) and the Foundation for Advancement in Conservation(FAIC)
The International Journal of Cultural Property published by Cambridge University Press
The Getty Conservation Institute
The Victoria And Albert Museum Conservation Journal 
The Midwest Art Conservation Center

References

External links 
 The Getty Conservation Institute has multiple resources through a YouTube Playlist on Panel Paintings Conservation and the Panel Painting Initiative page on their website
 Victoria and Albert: Conservation Treatment of a 17th Century English Panel Painting
 The Metropolitan Museum of Art: Structural Conservation: Dürer's Adam and Eve Panels
 Asian Art Museum: Conservation of a South Asian Painting

Painting
Conservation and restoration of paintings